Mairzy Doates (foaled 1976 in Kentucky) was an American Thoroughbred racehorse. She was owned by New York City art dealer Arno D. Schefler who bought her as a weanling from breeder Preston W. Madden. Schefler named her for the novelty song "Mairzy Doats" made popular in a 1943 recording by bandleader Al Trace.

Trained by future U.S. Racing Hall of Fame inductee, Horatio Luro, in 1981, Mairzy Doates competed successfully at racetracks in Florida, California and New York before going to Tokyo, Japan in November where she beat an international field to win the inaugural Japan Cup in course-record time.

References
 Mairzy Doates's pedigree and partial racing stats

1976 racehorse births
Racehorses bred in Kentucky
Racehorses trained in the United States
Japan Cup winners
Thoroughbred family 2-s